Łagiewniki  is a former village in the administrative district of Gmina Suchy Las, within Poznań County, Greater Poland Voivodeship, in west-central Poland.

The site of the village is now within the area of the military training ground centred on Biedrusko.

References

Villages in Poznań County